Leah Penniman (c. 1980) is a farmer, educator, author, and food sovereignty activist. Penniman is Co-Founder, Co-Director and Program Manager of Soul Fire Farm, in Grafton, New York.

Biography 

Leah Penniman was born to Reverend doctor Adele Smith Penniman, an African-American and Haitian American pastor and activist, and a white father. Penniman was raised in central Massachusetts with two siblings as the only family of color after the parents split and Adele moved to Boston. Penniman began farming at age 16, working with The Food Project in Boston in 1996 when staying with their mother. Penniman received an MA in Science Education and BA in Environmental Science and International Development from Clark University. After graduation, Penniman lived in a food desert in Albany, New York and was on WIC after giving birth. This experience led Penniman to see the need for food sovereignty in Black and Brown communities.

In 2006, Penniman purchased 72-acres of land in Grafton, New York to co-found Soul Fire Farm, and the farm officially opened in 2011. The name is taken from the song Soulfire by Lee "Scratch" Perry and originally focused on a farm share for low-income people. As Soul Fire Farm has grown, its mission is to end racism and injustice in the food system and by reclaiming the inherent right to belong to the earth and to have agency in the food system as Black and Brown people. The farm's flagship program is the Black Latinx Farmers Immersion, a 50-hour course to train beginner farmers. By 2018, 500 individuals had taken the course.

Penniman has been farming since 1996 and teaching since 2002. Penniman has worked at the Food Project, Farm School, Many Hands Organic Farm, Youth Grow and with farmers internationally in Ghana, Haiti, and Mexico. Penniman has also worked as a science teacher at University Park Campus School, Tech Valley High School, and Darrow School and was founding director of the Harriet Tubman Democratic High School.

In 2018, Penniman published Farming While Black, a book designed to create sustainable, equitable, profitable, and dignified relationships with food that historically disenfranchised communities eat, and the land it comes from.

Recognition 
The work of Penniman and Soul Fire Farm has been recognized by the Soros Racial Justice Fellowship, Fulbright Program, Presidential Award for Science Teaching, NYS Health Emerging Innovator Awards, and Andrew Goodman Foundation, among others.

In 2019, Penniman was awarded the James Beard Foundation Leadership Award for facilitating food sovereignty programs.

Publications 
2020: To free ourselves we must feed ourselves. Rapid Response Opinion, Agriculture and Human Values (published May 11)
 2018: Farming While Black: Soul Fire Farm’s Practical Guide to Decolonizing Land, Food, and Agriculture. Chelsea Green Publishing (November 8, 2018)
 2018: Uprooting Racism, Seeding Sovereignty. Schumacher Center for a New Economics.
 2018: Sowing the Seeds of Food Justice: A Guide for Farmers Who Want to Supply Low Income Communities While Maintaining Financial Sustainability, SARE Research Manual
 2017: Land Justice, published by Food First. Contributing author. 
 2017: Perma/Culture, published by Routledge. Contributing author. 
 2017: Cherry Bombe Cookbook, published by Clarkson Potter, Contributing author. 
 2017: 4 Not-So-Easy Ways to Dismantle Racism in the Food System. no ! Magazine
 2016: At Soul Fire Farm #blacklivesmatter and #black land matters, Fortune Magazine
 2016: After a Century of Decline, Black Farmers on the Rise YES!Magazine
 2015: USDA Puts $34.3 million into local food, but is it enough?YES! Magazine
 2015: Four Ways Mexico’s Indigenous Farmers are Practicing the Agriculture of the Future. YES! Magazine
 2015: Living and Learning in Oaxaca, New York Organic News, Volume 33, No 1, Spring
 2015: Radical Farmers Use Fresh Food to Fight Racial Injustice.YES! Magazine  (Republished in Solutions Journal) 2014: Black and Latino Farmers Immersion. YES! Magazine (Republished 2015 in Urban Food Stories)

Personal life 
Penniman identifies as genderqueer/multigender. Penniman lives on the farm with a partner, Jonah Vitale-Wolff and their two children, Neshima and Emet Vitale-Penniman.

References 

People from Massachusetts
Year of birth missing (living people)
Living people
American farmers
African-American activists
21st-century African-American people